The Ellinbank and District Football League is an Australian rules football and Netball League, based in the West Gippsland region of Victoria for smaller towns and villages in the regions of Baw Baw, South Gippsland and Cardinia.

There are 11 teams in the league fielding 2 senior football sides and 2 football junior sides (U/16 and U/18) and 3 senior netball sides and 3 junior netball sides.

History
The EDFL was founded in 1937.

In 2014, the league partitioned into two geographic divisions which operated as separate competitions with separate premiers. In this season, the seven-team western division comprised Nar Nar Goon, Garfield, Cora Lynn, Koo-wee-rup, Bunyip, Catani and Lang Lang; and the eastern division, with eight clubs, comprised Nyora, Poowong, Ellinbank, Nilma-Darnum, Warragul Industrials, Buln Buln, Neerim-Neerim South and Longwarry. This partition lasted only one year, and the league rejoined as a single division again from 2015.

In 2016 C31 broadcast a live match of the EDFL game between Koo Wee Rup and Cora Lynn.

In 2017 five clubs were redirected to found the West Gippsland Football Netball League. This left the league with ten clubs. The 2019 senior premiership was won by Longwarry Football Club over Ellinbank by 39 points. The grand final was played at Dowton Park Yarragon.

In the 2018 AFL Gippsland League Review, Yarragon joined from the neighbouring Mid Gippsland League. Warragul Industrials moved to the West Gippsland League, keeping the competition at ten clubs.

Due to the Coronavirus (COVID-19) outbreak, all EDFL competitions were abandoned for season 2020. Season 2021 saw games resume but due to COVID-19 restrictions a finals series was not played and there were no premiers. 

In 2021 the Trafalgar Football and Netball Club joined the EDFL taking the total teams to 11. 2021 will also see the junior age structure change to Under 16.5 and Under 18.5

In 2022 the Ellinbank & District Football League and Ellinbank & District Netball Association will merge to form the Ellinbank & District Football Netball League (EDFNL).  The junior age groups will revert to Under 16 and Under 18 in football.

The 2022 senior premiership was won by Neerim-Neerim South over Buln Buln by 1 point. This ended a 23-year premiership drought for Neerim and giving them their 8th EDFL premiership. The grand final was played at Dowton Park Yarragon and the game was broadcast locally on SEN Track.

Current clubs

Premiers

 1937	 Wooreen 
 1938	 Warragul 2nds
 1939	 Ellinbank
 1940	 Warragul 2nds
 1941-45	 In Recess
 1946	 Ellinbank
 1947	 Darnum
 1948	 Warragul Ind
 1949	 Nilma Lillico
 1950	 Hallora
 1951	 Nilma Lillico
 1952	 Ellinbank
 1953	 Ellinbank
 1954	 Ellinbank
 1955	 Ellinbank
 1956	 Buln Buln
 1957	 Noojee/Junction
 1958	 Hallora Strez
 1959	 Nilma Lillico
 1960	 Warragul Ind
 1961	 Ellinbank
 1962	 Neerim Neerim South
 1963	 Ellinbank
 1964	 Neerim Neerim South
 1965	 Buln Buln
 1966	 Neerim Neerim South
 1967	 Poowong
 1968	 Hallora Strez
 1969	 Hallora Strez

 1970	 Poowong
 1971	 Hallora Strez 
 1972	 Poowong
 1973	 Poowong
 1974	 Ellinbank
 1975	 Ellinbank
 1976	 Warragul Ind
 1977	 Poowong
 1978	 Neerim Neerim South
 1979	 Buln Buln
 1980	 Buln Buln
 1981	 Buln Buln
 1982	 Neerim Neerim South
 1983	 Ellinbank
 1984	 Ellinbank
 1985	 Poowong
 1986	 Warragul Ind
 1987	 Ellinbank
 1988	 Ellinbank
 1989	 Poowong
 1990	 Bunyip
 1991	 Poowong
 1992	 Catani
 1993	 Nyora
 1994	 Buln Buln
 1995	 Ellinbank
 1996	 Warragul Ind
 1997	 Buln Buln
 1998	 Neerim Neerim South

 1999	 Neerim Neerim South
 2000	 Bunyip
 2001	 Buln Buln
 2002	 Buln Buln
 2003	 Poowong
 2004	 Catani 
 2005	 Catani
 2006	 Nyora
 2007	 Nyora
 2008	 Cora Lynn
 2009	 Nilma Darnum
 2010	Nar Nar Goon
 2011	Garfield
 2012	 Bunyip
 2013	 Garfield
 2014  Buln Buln (East)
 2014  Cora Lynn (West)
 2015	Cora Lynn
 2016	Cora Lynn
 2017	Catani
 2018	Nyora
 2019 Longwarry
2020 League in recess due to COVID19 pandemic 
2021 No finals series due to COVID19 pandemic
2022 Neerim Neerim South

VFL/AFL players

 Barry Bourke - Neerim Neerim South - 
 Jai Newcombe - Poowong -

References

External links
 Full Points Footy – Ellinbank & District Football League
Official EDFL website

Australian rules football competitions in Victoria (Australia)